Laura Orsini (Rome, 30 November 1492 - Rome, 1530) was an Italian noblewoman, daughter of Giulia Farnese and, presumably, of her lover Pope Alexander VI Borgia.

Biography 
Laura Orsini was born in Rome, Italy, on 30 November 1492. She was the only child of Giulia Farnese (Pope Paulus III's sister). Her paternity is instead controversial: the baby girl was declared daughter of Giulia's legitimate husband, Orsino Orsini, however at the time of her birth Giulia was notoriously the lover of Pope Alexander VI Borgia, and later she declared that her daughter was born from this relationship, although Borgia never recognized or cared for Laura, unlike what he did for his other children. The question is currently being debated.

On 2 April 1499 at Palazzo Farnese Laura was promised in marriage to Federico Farnese, son of Raimondo Farnese and nephew of Pier Paolo Farnese. The engagement was later dissolved.

On 16 November 1505 she married Nicola Franciotti della Rovere, with a dowry of 300,000 ducats. The marriage had been organized by Pope Julius II della Rovere, the groom's uncle and successor and enemy of Alexander VI, who wished to ally himself with the Farnese and Orsini families. The couple had two children: Giulio (died  1550) and Lavinia della Rovere ( 1521 - 26 July 1601), who married Paolo Orsini di Mentana.

From her legal father Orsino Laura received the Carbognano feud as gift, which was then inherited by Lavinia. Laura died in Rome in 1530, around thirty-eight age.

References 

1492 births
1530 deaths
Italian untitled nobility
16th-century Italian nobility
Nobility from Rome
16th-century Italian women
Renaissance women
Orsini family
House of Farnese
House of Borgia
Illegitimate children of Pope Alexander VI
Illegitimate children of popes